Gunther Brewing Company is a historic brewery industrial building complex, located in the Canton neighborhood of southeast  Baltimore, Maryland, (United States). The site comprises 15 masonry buildings.  The main structure is a five-story brick "L"-shaped Romanesque Revival-style brew house with a two-story brick ice plant built about 1910 and one- and two-story boiler room. Additional brew houses built in 1936 and 1950 are also on the property.  The later Tulkoff factory and warehouse was built about 1964.  It was home to the George Gunther, Jr. Brewing Company, founded in 1900.  By 1959, it was the second largest brewery in Baltimore, one of the major centers of brewing in America, when it produced 800,000 barrels per year and employed approximately 600 people. Hamm's Brewing Company bought the Gunther Brewing Company in 1960, and later became part of Miller Brewing Company.  The brand was acquired just three years later by the F. & M. Schaefer Brewing Company in 1963, the plant in Canton was closed in 1978.  The Tulkoff company briefly used the factory for their sauce products at the conclusion of all brewing operations.

After that, large portions of the rear walls of some buildings were demolished to facilitate salvage.  The former brewery has been redeveloped into a modern, mixed-use building called The Gunther, much like other Canton buildings.

Gunther Brewing Company was listed on the National Register of Historic Places in 2002, which is maintained by the National Park Service of the United States Department of the Interior.

References

External links
, including photo from 2002, at Maryland Historical Trust
The Gunther historic building redevelopment, including history of building
 Redevelopment article

Beer brewing companies based in Maryland
Canton, Baltimore
Industrial buildings completed in 1900
Brewery buildings in the United States
Industrial buildings and structures on the National Register of Historic Places in Baltimore
Defunct companies based in Baltimore
Manufacturing companies based in Baltimore